The Apertura 2011 season (officially known as Torneo Apertura 2011 or also known as the Copa Capri for sponsoring reasons) was the 27th edition of El Salvador's Primera División since its establishment of an Apertura and Clausura format. Alianza entered into this tournament as the defending champions. The season began on 30 July 2011 and concluded at the end of the year. Like previous years, the league consisted of 10 teams, each playing a home and away game against the other clubs for a total of 18 games, respectively. The top four teams by the end of the season took part in the playoffs.

Team information
Last updated: June 28, 2011

Promotion and relegation
Promoted from Segunda División de Fútbol Salvadoreño as of June 28, 2011.
 Champions: Juventud Independiente

Relegated to Segunda División de Fútbol Salvadoreño as of June 28, 2011.
 Due to Issue: Atlético Balboa

Stadia and locations

Personnel and sponsoring

Managerial changes

Before the start of the season

During the regular season

League table

Positions by round

Results

Playoffs

Semi-finals

First leg

Second leg

Final

Player statistics

Top scorers

 Updated to games played on November 23, 2011. 
 Post-season goals are not included, only regular season goals.

Bookings

Hat-tricks

Individual awards

Season statistics

Scoring
 First goal of the season:  Osael Romero for Águila against Once Municipal 39 minutes (30 July 2011)
 Fastest goal in a match: 2 minutes
 Anel Canales for C.D. Luis Ángel Firpo against FAS (2 October 2011)
 Goal scored at the latest point in a match: 90+4 minutes
 Jaime Alas for Firpo against FAS (31 July 2011)
  Mardoqueo Henríquez for Águila against Firpo (22 October 2011)
 First penalty Kick of the season: 45 minutes- Williams Reyes (scored) for FAS against Luis Ángel Firpo
 Widest winning margin: 5
 Águila 5-1 Juventud Independiente (28 August 2011)
 Once Municipal 5-0 Vista Hermosa (27 November 2011)
 Most goals in a match: 9
 Luis Ángel Firpo 6-3 Once Municipal (2 November 2011)
 First hat-trick of the season:  Nicolás Muñoz for Águila against UES (17 August 2011)
 First own goal of the season:  Fidel Jiménez (Atlético Marte) for Firpo (21 August 2011)
 Most goals by one player in a single match: 3
  Nicolás Muñoz for Águila against UES (17 August 2011)
  Nicolás Muñoz for Águila against Juventud Independiente (28 August 2011)
  Anel Canales for Luis Ángel Firpo against Once Municipal (2 November 2011)
  Sean Fraser for Once Municipal against Vista Hermosa (27 November 2011)
 Most goals by one team in a match: 6
 Luis Ángel Firpo 6-3 Once Municipal (2 November 2011)
 Most goals in one half by one team: 4
 Juventud Independiente 1-4 Isidro Metapán(27 November 2011)
 Most goals scored by losing team: 3
 Luis Ángel Firpo 6-3 Once Municipal (2 November 2011)
 Atlético Marte 5-3 Isidro Metapán(5 November 2011)

Average home attendance
 Highest average home attendance:
 Lowest average home attendance:

Clean sheets
 Most clean sheets - 6 FAS and Atlético Marte
 Fewest clean sheets - 3 Águila

Unbeaten run
 Longest winning run - 4 games FAS (28 August-21 September) and Once Municipal (21 September-23 October)
 Longest unbeaten run - 8 games FAS (1 August-21 September) and Once Municipal (21 September-30 October)
 Longest winless run - 14 games UES(27 August-27 November 2011)
 Longest losing run - 6 games Juventud Independiente (17 August-21 September)

List of foreign players in the league
This is a list of foreign players in Apertura 2011. The following players:
 have played at least one apertura game for the respective club.
 have not been capped for the El Salvador national football team on any level, independently from the birthplace

A new rule was introduced a few season ago, that clubs can only have three foreign players per club and can only add a new player if there is an injury or player/s is released.

C.D. Águila
  Lucas Marcal
  Glauber Da Silva
  Rómulo

Alianza F.C.
  Leonardo Da Silva
  John Castillo

Atlético Marte
  James Owusu-Ansah
  Alcides Bandera
  Juan Ángel Sosa

Juventud Independiente
  Juan Carlos Reyes
  Valtinho
  Alyson Batista
  Leonardo Viera Lima

C.D. FAS
  Alejandro Bentos
  Roberto Peña
  Marcio Teruel

 (player released mid season)

C.D. Luis Ángel Firpo
  Anel Canales
  Erick Marín
  Pilo

A.D. Isidro Metapán
  Ernesto Aquino
  Allan Kardeck
  Paolo Suárez

Once Municipal
  Pablo Hütt
  Sean Fraser
  Andres Medina

UES
  TBA
  Flavio Viana
  Raphael Alves

Vista Hermosa
  Miguel Potes Mina 
  Luis Torres
  Garrick Gordon

External links
 
 El Grafico League Coverage 

Primera División de Fútbol Profesional Apertura seasons
El
1